Andrův stadion is a football stadium in Olomouc, Czech Republic. It is the home ground of SK Sigma Olomouc and occasionally hosts matches of the Czech Republic national team. The stadium holds 12,474 people.

It was built in 1940 and is named after Josef Ander (1888-1976), local interwar businessman and philanthropist who also sponsored football in Olomouc. In the past, historical clubs SK Olomouc ASO and Křídla vlasti Olomouc played there.

International football matches

The Czech Republic have played 13 full international matches at Andrův stadion, the first one taking place in 1998. These have mainly been matches against less attractive opposition where a relatively small crowd is expected, and it has therefore been unnecessary to play the match in Prague.

References

External links

 SK Sigma Olomouc website
 Photo gallery and data at Erlebnis-stadion.de
 Areal maps
 Ander stadion

Football venues in the Czech Republic
Czech First League venues
SK Sigma Olomouc
Buildings and structures in Olomouc
Multi-purpose stadiums in the Czech Republic
Sports venues completed in 1940
1940 establishments in Czechoslovakia
20th-century architecture in the Czech Republic